Forfarshire was a Scottish county constituency represented in the House of Commons of Great Britain from 1708 until 1800, and then in the House of Commons of the United Kingdom until 1950.

It elected one Member of Parliament (MP) using the first-past-the-post voting system.

Creation
The British parliamentary constituency was created in 1708 following the Acts of Union, 1707 and replaced the former Parliament of Scotland shire constituency of Forfarshire.

Boundaries 

The Representation of the People Act 1918 defined the constituency as consisting of the county of Forfar, except the county of the city of Dundee and the burghs of Montrose, Arbroath, Brechin, and Forfar. The four excepted burghs formed part of the Montrose District of Burghs.

The county of Forfarshire was renamed Angus in 1928. However, no change was made in the name of the constituency prior to its abolition.

History
The constituency elected one Member of Parliament (MP) by the first-past-the-post system until the seat was abolished for the 1950 general election.

The constituency was abolished under the Representation of the People Act 1948, which reorganised parliamentary boundaries throughout the United Kingdom. The seat was divided between North Angus and Mearns (which also included Kincardineshire) and South Angus.

Members of Parliament

Election results

Elections in the 1830s

Maule was elevated to the peerage, becoming 1st Baron Panmure and causing a by-election.

 On petition, Ogilvy was unseated in favour of Gordon-Hallyburton

Elections in the 1840s

Elections in the 1850s

Maule was appointed Surveyor-General of the Ordnance, requiring a by-election.

Maule's death caused a by-election.

Haldane-Duncan was appointed a Lord Commissioner of the Treasury, requiring a by-election.

Elections in the 1860s
Haldane-Duncan succeeded to the peerage, becoming Earl of Camperdown, and causing a by-election.

Elections in the 1870s
Carnegie resigned after being appointed Inspector of Constabulary for Scotland.

Elections in the 1880s

Elections in the 1890s

Rigby is appointed Solicitor General for England and Wales, requiring a by-election.

Rigby resigns after being appointed a Lord Justice of Appeal, triggering a by-election.

White resigns, triggering a by-election.

Elections in the 1900s

Elections in the 1910s

Elections in the 1920s

Elections in the 1930s

Elections in the 1940s
General Election 1939–40:

Another General Election was required to take place before the end of 1940. The political parties had been making preparations for an election to take place from 1939 and by the end of this year, the following candidates had been selected; 
Unionist: William T. Shaw
Liberal:

References 

Historic parliamentary constituencies in Scotland (Westminster)
Constituencies of the Parliament of the United Kingdom established in 1708
Constituencies of the Parliament of the United Kingdom disestablished in 1950
Politics of Angus, Scotland
Politics of the county of Forfar